Kirsan may refer to:
 5570 Kirsan, a main-belt asteroid named after Kirsan Ilyumzhinov
 Alp Kırşan (born 1979), a Turkish actor
 Kirsan Ilyumzhinov (born 1962), a politician and chess grandmaster